Det lysande ögat ("The Shining Eye") is a Swedish children's detective novel of 2005 written by Laura Trenter and Tony Manieri. It is the first book in the series "Nadja and Charlie, Detective Duo", and is followed by Stackelstrands hemlighet ("The Secret of Stackel Beach").

Plot
There is a mystery with the new archeologist of the museum, why he is so interesting about the shipwreck which sank? Is it haunting in the mill? Later Charlie's and Nadja's classmate Jackie disappears and they find one of her shoes at the beach.

References and sources
Det lysande ögat on bokia.se

2005 novels
Swedish children's novels
2005 Swedish novels
Books by Laura Trenter
Children's mystery novels
2005 children's books
Swedish detective novels